Approbation may refer to:
 Approbation (Catholic canon law), an act in the Catholic Church by which a bishop or other legitimate superior grants to an ecclesiastic the actual exercise of his ministry
 The process of granting a medical license in Germany
 Approbation Comics, a comic book company